The Borate and Daggett Railroad was a  narrow gauge railroad built to carry borax in the Mojave Desert.

History

In 1883, prospectors discovered a rich vein of colemanite borax in the Calico Mountains 4 miles east from the silver mining town of Calico. The claim was bought by mining tycoon William Tell Coleman, who owned and worked several borax mines in Death Valley, including the Harmony Borax Works, famous for the Twenty-mule teams which were used to haul borax to the railroads at Mojave, California. In 1890, Coleman went bankrupt and his business associate Francis Marion Smith bought up all of his former borax mining enterprises to form the Pacific Coast Borax Company. Smith was interested in using the borax deposits at Calico, now called "Borate," as his new company's main source of income. By 1899, Borate had become the largest borax mine in the world, outputting  of borate out of over a dozen shafts at the mine.

At first, twenty-mule teams had been used to haul the borax to the railhead at Daggett, California, but Smith was not happy with the cost and upkeep with the mules and wagons, and in 1894, made efforts to replace them with a Daniel Best steam tractor (now called "Old Dinah") which was not well equipped for running in the desert. After two years, "Dinah" was retired and Smith set to construct a narrow-gauge railroad between Borate and Daggett. The railroad was completed in 1898, and used two Heisler steam locomotives named "Marion" and "Francis" after Francis Marion Smith himself, to haul the ore. They also built a roasting mill on the halfway point on the railroad, also named "Marion" for Francis Marion Smith. Here the little engines brought the ore to be roasted and loaded into burlap bags. A 3rd rail was built to the mill to accommodate bringing standard gauge boxcars to the mill, so little time can be wasted transferring the borax between the narrow-gauge and standard gauge railroads.

By 1904, the decline in quality of the borate ore was beginning to show, and Smith immediately set his sights to Death Valley to find a successor for borate. As soon as the T&T reached the Lila C. in October 1907, all mining operations at Borate were ceased and the Borate & Daggett Railroad abandoned. Most of the rails were taken up and sold for scrap, and the two locomotives along with the rolling stock were left behind on a little siding in Daggett adjacent to the Santa Fe mainline. They would not see use again until 1913, when Pacific Coast Borax required narrow-gauge railway equipment to help construct the Death Valley Railroad. Once that was done, the old and tired Heisler locomotives lived out the rest of their days in the timber fields of Oregon and northern California with the rest of their kin.

See also

 United States Potash Railroad
 Waterloo Mining Railroad

External links
 The Tonopah and Tidewater and Its Environs - see Borate and Daggett page and Images Database
 gearedsteam.com Geared Steam - A page about Heisler locomotives and a snippet about the 'Francis'
 PacificNG - Concerning the fate of Heisler locomotive #1 "Marion", which saw use for the Modoc/Forest Lumber Company of Pine Ridge, Oregon'

Defunct California railroads
Mining railways in the United States
Mining in California
History of the Mojave Desert region
History of San Bernardino County, California
3 ft gauge railways in the United States
Narrow gauge railroads in California
Transportation in San Bernardino County, California
Borates